Dane Haylett-Petty (born 18 June 1989) is a retired Australian rugby union footballer who played as a fullback or wing for the Melbourne Rebels in Super Rugby and the Wallabies.

Early life
Haylett-Petty was born in Durban in the former Province  of Natal in South Africa. His family moved to Perth, Western Australia when Haylett-Petty was 10-years-old and attended the Hale School from 2000 to 2007 in the suburb of Wembley Downs. He played rugby for the Australia 'A' Schoolboys team in 2007.

Career
He made a total of 12 appearances spanning three seasons before heading north in 2010 to join French Top 14 side Biarritz. He stayed in France for 3 years, making more than 50 appearances before it was announced that he would head back home to join the Force for the 2014 Super Rugby season.

On August 11, 2017, the it was announced that the Western Force would be the Australian team axed from Super Rugby. Subsequently, Haylett-Petty and younger brother Ross officially signed for the Melbourne Rebels on two year deals starting in 2018.

Haylett-Petty announced his retirement in November 2021, due to ongoing concussion.

International career
Haylett-Petty represented Australia Under 20 in the 2008 and 2009 IRB Junior World Championships and he jointly holds the record for the most tries scored by a single player in a JWC match.  His haul of 4 tries against Canada Under 20 in 2008 is equalled only by compatriots Kurtley Beale and Richard Kingi against the same opposition in 2009 and New Zealander Julian Savea against Samoa Under 20 in 2010.

He is also a former Australia Sevens player and featured in the IRB Sevens World Series in 2008 and 2009.

Super Rugby statistics

References

External links 
 
 

1989 births
Living people
Australia international rugby union players
Australian rugby sevens players
Australian rugby union players
Biarritz Olympique players
Expatriate rugby union players in France
Expatriate rugby union players in Japan
Male rugby sevens players
Melbourne Rebels players
Perth Spirit players
Rugby union fullbacks
Rugby union players from Durban
Rugby union wings
South African emigrants to Australia
Toyota Industries Shuttles Aichi players
Western Force players